Barnaby Backwell (died 3 October 1754) was the member of Parliament for Bishop's Castle, Shropshire, in 1754.

Early life 
Barnaby Backwell was the second but first surviving son of Tyringham Backwell of Tyringham, Buckinghamshire, and Elizabeth, daughter of Sir Francis Child, Lord Mayor of London. He was the grandson of the financier Edward Backwell.

Career
Backwell was a partner in the bank of Samuel and Francis Child, and said to have an income of £4,000 per annum. 

In the General election of 1754 he was elected to Parliament for Bishop's Castle, a "rotten borough", where his uncle Samuel Child had been the M.P. until his death in 1753. The borough was under the control of the Walcots who owed a great deal of money to Child's bank. Backwell was classed as a Tory in Dupplin's list of 1754.

He died the following October. He had married twice, firstly Margaret (d. 1745), the daughter of Samuel Clarke, a London merchant, and secondly Sarah Gibbon, with whom he had a son and 3 daughters. His daughter, Elizabeth Tyringham, married William Praed.

References

External links
http://www.historytoday.com/bevis-hiller/mysterious-case-elizabeth-canning

1754 deaths
Year of birth missing
People from Buckinghamshire
Members of the Parliament of Great Britain for English constituencies
British MPs 1754–1761
Politics of Shropshire
English bankers
Barnaby
Twickenham